The 2023 Charleston Open (branded as the 2023 Credit One Charleston Open for sponsorship reasons) is an upcoming professional women's tennis tournament to be played on outdoor clay courts at the Family Circle Tennis Center on Daniel Island in Charleston, South Carolina. It will be the 50th edition of the event on the WTA Tour and is classified as a WTA 500 tournament on the 2023 WTA Tour. It is the only event of the clay court season that is played on green clay.

Champions

Singles

Doubles

Points and prize money

Point distribution

Prize money

Singles main draw entrants

Seeds 

1 Rankings as of March 20, 2023.

Other entrants 
The following players received wildcards into the main draw:
  Emma Navarro
  Elina Svitolina 
  

The following player received entry using a protected ranking into the main draw: 
  Evgeniya Rodina

The following players received entry from the qualifying draw:

Withdrawals 
 Before the tournament
  Anett Kontaveit → replaced by  Evgeniya Rodina

Doubles main draw entrants

Seeds 

 Rankings are as of March 20, 2023.

Other entrants 
The following pair received a wildcard into the doubles main draw:
   /

References

External links 
 Tournament details at the WTA
 

2023 WTA Tour
2023 in American tennis
2023 in sports in South Carolina
2023 Credit One Charleston Open
April 2023 sports events in the United States